Carmen Adelina Gutiérrez Alonso (aka Adelina Gutiérrez, May 27, 1925 – April 11, 2015) was a Chilean scientist, academic and professor of astrophysics. She was the first Chilean to obtain a doctoral degree in astrophysics and the first woman to become a member of the Chilean Academy of Sciences.

Biography
Carmen Adelina Gutiérrez Alonso, was born on May 27, 1925 in Santiago, Chile. She was the daughter of Ramón Gutiérrez and Carmen Alonso. Gutiérrez studied at the Liceo Maria Auxiliadora de Santiago, from which she graduated in 1942. Later, she began pursuing a career as a physics and mathematics teacher by studying at the Pedagogical Institute of the University of Chile, from which she graduated as a state-approved teacher in 1948. While Gutiérrez was studying at the university, she met the scientist Hugo Moreno León, whom she married in 1951 and with whom she had three children.

Gutiérrez began working as a science teacher at the Liceo Dario Salas and the Faculty of Physical and Mathematical Sciences (FCFM) of the University of Chile. From June 1, 1949, Gutiérrez worked at National Astronomical Observatory of Chile. At that observatory, her work was initially restricted to analyzing astronomical data obtained by other scientists. While working there, Gutiérrez developed an interest in the photoelectric photometry of austral stars, a subject which she addressed in numerous publications. During the time that she was working at the National Astronomical Observatory, Gutiérrez also became a full faculty member in Faculty of Physical and Mathematical Sciences of the University of Chile.

In the late 1950s, Gutiérrez traveled to the United States to study for a PhD in astrophysics, which has obtained in June 1964, becoming the first Chilean to obtain such a degree. In 1965, after having returned to Chile, Gutiérrez, Hugo Moreno León and Claudio Anguita founded a bachelor's degree course in astronomy at the University of Chile. Gutiérrez was responsible for overseeing the course. In 1976, Gutiérrez also founded a master's degree course in astronomy at the University of Chile.

In 1967, Gutiérrez began working with Hugo Moreno León in the newly opened Cerro Tololo Observatory. That same year she was named a full member of the Chilean Academy of Sciences Institute. She was the first woman and the first astronomer to join that select group of scientists.

Adelina Gutiérrez died on April 11, 2015.

Tribute
On May 27, 2020, Google celebrated her 95th birthday with a Google Doodle.

Works

References

External links
 Adelina Gutiérrez in CONICYT 

1925 births
2015 deaths
Chilean scientists
Chilean astrophysicists
University of Chile alumni
People from Santiago